Eilema simulatricula is a moth of the subfamily Arctiinae. It was described by French entomologist Hervé de Toulgoët in 1955. It is found on Madagascar.

The larvae feed on lichens.

References

 

simulatricula
Moths described in 1955